PFA or Pfa may refer to:

Organizations 

 Pacific Film Archive, now part of the Berkeley Art Museum and Pacific Film Archive (BAM/PFA)
People for Animals, Indian animal welfare organisation
 PFA Footcare Association (Canadian Chapter)
 Police Federation of Australia
 Policía Federal Argentina, the Argentine Federal Police
 Popular Flying Association, a former name of the Light Aircraft Association 
 Popular Front of Azerbaijan, forerunner of the Popular Front Party of Azerbaijan (PFPA)
 Professional Fraternity Association

Science, technology, and mathematics

Chemistry and materials science
 Paraformaldehyde, a fixation solution
 Perfluoroalkoxy alkane, a plastic or polymer resin 
 Pulverised fuel ash, a waste product of pulverised coal
 Parafluoroamphetamine
 Performic acid
 See also PFAS, Per- and polyfluoroalkyl substances

Computer science 
 Probabilistic finite automaton
 .pfa, Printer Font ASCII, a file extension for PostScript Printer Font ASCII
 Predictive failure analysis, a technology for hard disk health monitoring, the predecessor of S.M.A.R.T.
 Portable Format for Analytics, a JSON-based file format for encoding data analytics, such as data mining models.
 PFA, an email abbreviation for "Please Find Attached" or "Please Find the Attachment"

Mathematics and statistics
 Prime-factor FFT algorithm, a fast algorithm for computing the discrete Fourier transform
 Proper forcing axiom
 Probability of False Alarm, a synonym for false positive rate which is commonly used in radar and related fields

Sport
 Pahang FA, a Malaysian association football club
 Palestinian Football Association
 Perak FA, a Malaysian association football club
 Professional Footballers' Association, the English and Welsh association football trade union
 Professional Footballers Australia, the Australian soccer trade union

Other uses
 Protection from abuse order
 Psychological first aid